Ayşe İmrohoroğlu (born c. 1959) is a Turkish economist who is Professor of Finance and Business Economics at the USC Marshall School of Business.

Biography 
İmrohoroğlu obtained her BS in Economics from the Middle East Technical University in 1980 and PhD from the University of Minnesota in 1988 with a dissertation titled "Aggregate Implications of Liquidity Constraints" under the advisory of Edward C. Prescott. She joined the USC Marshall School of Business in 1989 as an Assistant Professor of Finance and Business Economics, got appointed as an Associate Professor of Finance and Business Economics in 1994 and has been a Professor of Finance and Business Economics since 2000. She was also Chair of the Department of Finance and Business Economics from 2004 to 2007.

Her research interests include business cycles, inflation, unemployment insurance and social security. İmrohoroğlu received a grant from the National Science Foundation in 1992 to investigate the effects of social security programmes on economies with imperfect insurance. She served as an Associate Editor (2005-2012) and as an Editor (2012-2017) of European Economic Review. She was also an economic advisor to the Central Bank of the Republic of Turkey from 2013 to 2015.

She is married to the fellow Turkish economist at the USC Marshall School of Business Selahattin İmrohoroğlu.

Selected publications 
Journal articles
 İmrohoroğlu, A. (1989). "Cost of business cycles with indivisibilities and liquidity constraints". Journal of Political Economy, 97 (6), pp. 1364–1383. 
 İmrohoroğlu, A. & G. D. Hansen (1992). "The role of unemployment insurance in an economy with liquidity constraints and moral hazard". Journal of Political Economy, 100 (1), pp. 118–142. 
 İmrohoroğlu, A.; İmrohoroğlu, S. & D. H. Joines (1995). "A life cycle analysis of social security". Economic Theory, 6 (1), pp. 83–114. 
 İmrohoroğlu, A.; İmrohoroğlu, S. & D. H. Joines (1998). "The effect of tax-favored retirement accounts on capital accumulation". American Economic Review, 88 (4), pp. 749–768. 
 İmrohoroğlu, A.; İmrohoroğlu, S. & D. H. Joines (2003). "Time-inconsistent preferences and social security". The Quarterly Journal of Economics, 118 (2), pp. 745–784. 
 Fuster, L.; İmrohoroğlu, A. & S. İmrohoroğlu (2007). "Elimination of social security in a dynastic framework". The Review of Economic Studies, 74 (1), pp. 113–145. 
 Baccara, M.; İmrohoroğlu, A.; Wilson, A. J. & L. Yariv (2012). "A field study on matching with network externalities". American Economic Review, 102 (5), pp. 1773–1804. 

Books
 İmrohoroğlu, A. & İmrohoroğlu, S. (2012). The Fiscal Cliff: How America Can Avoid a Fall And Stay On Top. Ending Spending. .

References

External links 
 Ayşe İmrohoroğlu, biography page at USC Marshall School of Business
 

Interviews and speeches
 Interview with Ayse Imrohoroglu, interview during the 40th Annual Fall Conference of Federal Reserve Bank of St. Louis held on 15–16 October 2015
 Ayse Imrohoroglu on "Understanding National Savings", speech at the Society for Economic Dynamics Annual Meeting 2017 on 22 June 2017

Living people
1950s births
Turkish women economists
Turkish expatriates in the United States
21st-century Turkish  economists
University of Minnesota alumni
Middle East Technical University alumni